The 1991 Big Sky Conference men's basketball tournament was the sixteenth edition, held March 6–9 at Dahlberg Arena at the University of Montana in Missoula, Montana.

Top-seeded host Montana defeated two-time defending champion Idaho in the championship game,  to win their first Big Sky tournament title.

Format
No new teams were added to the Big Sky prior to the 1990–91 season, leaving total membership at nine.

No changes were made to the tournament format, except that host site was not predetermined and went to the regular season champion. The top six teams from the regular season were included; the top two earned byes into the semifinals while the remaining four played in the quarterfinals.

Bracket

NCAA tournament
The Grizzlies gained the automatic bid to the NCAA tournament, and no other Big Sky members were invited. Seeded sixteenth in the West Regional, Montana lost to UNLV in Tucson in the first round. Boise State hosted a first-round game in  but lost by a point to Southern Illinois.

See also
Big Sky Conference women's basketball tournament

References

Big Sky Conference men's basketball tournament
Tournament
Big Sky Conference men's basketball tournament
Big Sky Conference men's basketball tournament
Basketball competitions in Missoula, Montana
College sports tournaments in Montana